is a retired judoka from Japan. She claimed the bronze medal in the Women's Lightweight (– 56 kg) division at the 1992 Summer Olympics in Barcelona, Spain. In the bronze medal match she defeated Belgium's Nicole Flagothier.

External links
 
 

1970 births
Living people
Japanese female judoka
Judoka at the 1992 Summer Olympics
Olympic judoka of Japan
Olympic bronze medalists for Japan
Sportspeople from Osaka Prefecture
Olympic medalists in judo
Medalists at the 1992 Summer Olympics
Universiade medalists in judo
Goodwill Games medalists in judo
People from Moriguchi, Osaka
Universiade silver medalists for Japan
Medalists at the 1995 Summer Universiade
Competitors at the 1990 Goodwill Games
20th-century Japanese women
21st-century Japanese women